Matua is a suburb of Tauranga, in the Bay of Plenty Region of New Zealand's North Island.

Demographics

Matua had a population of 5,394 at the 2018 New Zealand census, an increase of 246 people (4.8%) since the 2013 census, and an increase of 318 people (6.3%) since the 2006 census. There were 2,067 households, comprising 2,550 males and 2,841 females, giving a sex ratio of 0.9 males per female, with 945 people (17.5%) aged under 15 years, 687 (12.7%) aged 15 to 29, 2,361 (43.8%) aged 30 to 64, and 1,398 (25.9%) aged 65 or older.

Ethnicities were 91.0% European/Pākehā, 8.6% Māori, 1.6% Pacific peoples, 4.4% Asian, and 2.1% other ethnicities. People may identify with more than one ethnicity.

The percentage of people born overseas was 22.5, compared with 27.1% nationally.

Although some people chose not to answer the census's question about religious affiliation, 52.1% had no religion, 37.9% were Christian, 0.4% had Māori religious beliefs, 0.6% were Hindu, 0.1% were Muslim, 0.4% were Buddhist and 1.7% had other religions.

Of those at least 15 years old, 1,125 (25.3%) people had a bachelor's or higher degree, and 657 (14.8%) people had no formal qualifications. 915 people (20.6%) earned over $70,000 compared to 17.2% nationally. The employment status of those at least 15 was that 1,938 (43.6%) people were employed full-time, 690 (15.5%) were part-time, and 117 (2.6%) were unemployed.

Education 

The school was established in 1965 as Levers Road School, and adopted its current name in 1966.

References

Suburbs of Tauranga
Populated places around the Tauranga Harbour